is a Japanese anime television series produced by Diomedéa and directed by Keizō Kusakawa. The series aired in Japan between July 7 and September 29, 2017, and is licensed in North America by Sentai Filmworks. A manga adaptation by Azuse was serialized in Young Champion Retsu in 2017.

Plot
Due to the popularity of a certain city's "action heroine", many districts across Japan have taken on their own local action heroines, holding various live action hero shows to promote their towns. Misaki Shirogane is a high school girl and niece of the governor of Hinano City, which is in heavy debt due to its dwindling popularity. After witnessing two of her fellow students, Ann Akagi and Mikan Kise, putting on an amateur hero show, Misaki enrolls them and other girls into the Action Heroine Project, in which they become local heroines and put on live shows to help revitalize their town.

Characters

The daughter of Hinano City's governor and student council president of her school. Wanting to help revitalize her town, Misaki heads up the Action Heroine Project to recruit heroines. She directs and hosts the Hina Nectar shows and occasionally shows up on stage in a white Hina Nectar uniform as Athena Platinum.

An athletic high school girl who is a big fan of tokusatsu, in particular Kami Daioh, the Action Heroine of Kamiari City. It is her performance with Mikan that inspires Misaki to start up the Action Heroine Project. She plays Medica Red, the leader of the Hina Nectars.

The student council vice-president and Misaki's best friend. Her family operates Hinano's train station, providing the Cheer Fruits with a place to stage their performances. In the Hina Nectar shows she plays the main villain Rokomo Black, and occasionally wears a black Hina Nectar uniform (such as when the girls perform the theme song).

A shy girl who works hard for her little sister, Yuzuka. She asked Ann to perform a Kami Daioh show for Yuzuka, which was noticed by Misaki and lead to the formation of the Cheer Fruits. She writes the scripts for the Hina Nectar shows and plays Cheer Yellow, with Misaki occasionally giving her hosting duties in the hopes of building Mikan's confidence.

A girl whose family runs Hinano's shrine. She often acts in a mercenary fashion, driving business to the shrine so she can have a larger allowance. She makes the costumes for the Hina Nectar shows and plays Terra Green.

A paraplegic girl who is skilled with computers, including using audio software. She handles the special effects, sound mixing, and music composition for the stage shows. Promotional materials show her wearing a blue Hina Nectar uniform identical to her sister's.

Genki's twin sister, a former pop idol who quit after being pressured to exploit her sister's disability for sympathy. She has low self-esteem, sometimes descending into a "world of paranoia" (as Genki calls it) in which she believes people hate her even if they're actually being friendly and kind. After being convinced to join the Cheer Fruits, she leads the performance of the theme song and plays Sein Blue, who hails from Hinano's sister city of Cuernavaca, Mexico.

A young girl whose family operates a major construction firm in Hinano. She greatly admires Misaki, whom she refers to as "Lady Gozen" (a character from Ninpuu Sentai Hurricaneger). She manages the Cheer Fruits' practical effects (including pyrotechnics) and plays the Hina Nectars' fifth member, Nitro Pink.

A rich girl who considers Ann her arch-rival, stemming from their gymnastics competitions. However, Ann sees her as a friend rather than a rival, giving her by the embarrassing nickname "Muramura". Because of her athletic skill and rapport with Ann, she is cast as one of the villains in the Hina Nectars show known as Deep Purple and wears a purple Hina Nectar uniform during songs.

Media

Manga
A manga adaptation by Azuse was serialized in Akita Shoten's Young Champion Retsu magazine from June 20 to October 17, 2017.

Anime
Action Heroine Cheer Fruits is directed by Keizō Kusakawa and produced by Diomedéa. The series aired in Japan between July 7 and September 29, 2017. The screenplay is written by Naruhisa Arakawa and character design is by Naomi Ide. The music is produced by Nippon Columbia. Sentai Filmworks has licensed the anime and simulcast the series on Hidive.

Notes

References

External links
 

2017 anime television series debuts
Akita Shoten manga
Anime with original screenplays
Diomedéa
Seinen manga
Sentai Filmworks
TBS Television (Japan) original programming